Croatia competed at the 2016 Summer Olympics in Rio de Janeiro, Brazil, from 5 to 21 August 2016. This was the nation's seventh consecutive appearance at the Summer Olympics. The Croatian Olympic Committee (HOO) confirmed a roster of 87 athletes, 68 men and 19 women, to compete across 18 sports at the Games.

Croatia left Rio de Janeiro with a total of 10 medals (5 gold, 3 silver, and 2 bronze), finishing seventeenth in the overall standings. These Games also marked the nation's most successful outcome in Summer Olympic history since the break-up of SFR Yugoslavia, surpassing the six medals won at London 2012. Three of the medals were awarded to the team in track and field, two in rowing and sailing, and one each in shooting and boxing. Croatia also proved particularly successful in traditional team sports, as the water polo players obtained the silver medal in the men's tournament, despite losing its title defense to neighboring Serbia at the final match.

Among the medalists were super heavyweight boxer Filip Hrgović and Laser sailor Tonči Stipanović, who both secured historic first Olympic medals for Croatia in their respective sports. 470 duo Šime Fantela and Igor Marenić controlled the race ahead of their top rivals Australia and Greece to win the nation's first ever sailing title. Discus thrower Sandra Perković successfully defended her Olympic title, while 21-year-old Sara Kolak trounced the vastly experienced field to become the women's javelin throw champion. Shooter Josip Glasnović succeeded his teammate Giovanni Cernogoraz as the new Olympic champion in the men's trap. Brothers Martin and Valent Sinković fought a tough duel against Lithuania to capture a gold medal in the men's double sculls, adding it to their world and European titles over the last two years.

Medalists

| width=78% align=left valign=top |

| width=22% align=left valign=top |
|  style="text-align:left; width:22%; vertical-align:top;"|

Competitors
The Croatian Olympic Committee (HOO) fielded a team of 87 athletes, 68 men and 19 women, across eighteen sports at the Games; it was the nation's fourth-largest delegation sent to the Olympics, but the smallest since 2004.

More than 50 percent of the men's side competed in traditional team sports, with the water polo players looking to defend their Olympic title from the London Games four years earlier. Track and field accounted for the largest number of athletes on the squad by an individual-based sport, with 10 entries. There was a single competitor each in diving, judo, table tennis, weightlifting, and wrestling.

Nine of the past Olympic medalists from the individual-based sports returned, including defending champions Giovanni Cernogoraz (men's trap shooting) and Sandra Perković (women's discus throw), taekwondo fighter Lucija Zaninović (women's 49 kg), along with her twin sister Ana, rifle shooter Snježana Pejčić, gymnast Filip Ude (men's pommel horse), and experienced high jumper Blanka Vlašić. Rowers Damir Martin and brothers Martin and Valent Sinković, all of whom won silver as members of the quadruple sculls crew from London 2012, qualified separately for the smaller boats at the Games, with the latter two entering as reigning world champions and top medal favorites in the double sculls.

Other notable athletes on the Croatian roster included world sailing champions Šime Fantela and Igor Marenić in the men's 470 class, world-ranked tennis player Marin Čilić, and boxing pro Filip Hrgović (men's super heavyweight). Water polo goalkeeper Josip Pavić, who helped his team secure a gold-medal triumph in the men's tournament at London 2012, was selected by the committee as Croatia's flag bearer for the opening ceremony.

| width=78% align=left valign=top |The following is the list of number of competitors participating in the Games. Note that reserves in fencing, field hockey, football, gymnastics, handball and rowing are not counted as athletes:

Athletics

Croatian athletes have achieved qualifying standards in the following athletics events (up to a maximum of 3 athletes in each event):

Track & road events

Field events
Men

Women

Basketball

Men's tournament

Croatia men's basketball team qualified for the Olympics by securing its lone outright berth and winning the final match over Italy at the Turin leg of the 2016 FIBA World Qualifying Tournament, signifying the nation's comeback to the men's tournament after an eight-year hiatus.

Team roster

Group play

Quarterfinal

Boxing

Croatia has entered two boxers to compete in the following weight classes into the Olympic boxing tournament. Hrvoje Sep and Filip Hrgović were the only Croatians to be selected to the Olympic team by virtue of top two finishes of their respective division in the AIBA Pro Boxing series and World Series of Boxing.

Cycling

Road
Croatian riders qualified for a maximum of two quota places in the men's Olympic road race by virtue of their top 15 final national ranking in the 2015 UCI Europe Tour.

Diving

Croatia has received a spare continental berth freed up by South Africa from FINA to send a diver competing in the women's individual springboard to the Olympics, based on her results at the 2016 FINA World Cup series, signifying the nation's Olympic debut in the sport.

Gymnastics

Artistic
Croatia has entered two artistic gymnasts into the Olympic competition. Beijing 2008 silver medalist Filip Ude and Ana Đerek had claimed their Olympic spots each in the men's and women's apparatus and all-around events, respectively, at the Olympic Test Event in Rio de Janeiro.

Men

Women

Handball

Summary

Men's tournament

Croatia men's handball team qualified for the Olympics by virtue of a top two finish at the third meet of the Olympic Qualification Tournament in Herning, Denmark.

Team roster

Group play

Quarterfinal

Judo

Croatia has qualified one judoka for the women's middleweight category (70 kg) at the Games. Barbara Matić earned a continental quota spot from the European region as highest-ranked Croatian judoka outside of direct qualifying position in the IJF World Ranking List of 30 May 2016.

Rowing

Croatia qualified two boats for each of the following classes into the Olympic regatta. Rowers competing in the men's single and double sculls had confirmed Olympic places for their boats at the 2015 FISA World Championships in Lac d'Aiguebelette, France.

Qualification Legend: FA=Final A (medal); FB=Final B (non-medal); FC=Final C (non-medal); FD=Final D (non-medal); FE=Final E (non-medal); FF=Final F (non-medal); SA/B=Semifinals A/B; SC/D=Semifinals C/D; SE/F=Semifinals E/F; QF=Quarterfinals; R=Repechage

Sailing

Croatian sailors qualified one boat in each of the following classes through the 2014 ISAF Sailing World Championships, the individual fleet Worlds, and European qualifying regattas.

Men

Women

M = Medal race; EL = Eliminated – did not advance into the medal race

Shooting

Croatian shooters achieved quota places for the following events by virtue of their best finishes at the 2014 and 2015 ISSF World Championships, the 2015 ISSF World Cup series, and European Championships or Games, as long as they obtained a minimum qualifying score (MQS) by 31 March 2016.

Following the completion of the two-year qualifying period, Croatia had selected a total of seven shooters to compete at the Games, including 2008 Olympic bronze medalist Snježana Pejčić and defending Olympic trap champion Giovanni Cernogoraz.

Men

Women

Qualification Legend: Q = Qualify for the next round; q = Qualify for the bronze medal (shotgun)

Swimming

Croatian swimmers achieved qualifying standards in the following events (up to a maximum of 2 swimmers in each event at the Olympic Qualifying Time (OQT), and 1 at the Olympic Selection Time (OST)):

Table tennis

Croatia has entered one athlete into the table tennis competition at the Games. Remarkably going to his third Olympics, Andrej Gaćina was automatically selected among the top 22 eligible players in the men's singles based on the ITTF Olympic Rankings.

Taekwondo

Croatia entered three athletes into the taekwondo competition at the Olympics. Twin sisters and 2012 Olympians Lucija and Ana Zaninović qualified automatically and respectively for the women's flyweight (49 kg) and featherweight (57 kg) category by finishing in the top 6 WTF Olympic rankings. Filip Grgić secured the third spot on the Croatian team by virtue of his top two finish in the men's lightweight category (68 kg) at the 2016 European Qualification Tournament in Istanbul, Turkey.

Tennis

Croatia has entered four tennis players into the Olympic tournament. London 2012 Olympian Marin Čilić (world no. 13) and Borna Ćorić (world no. 48) qualified directly for the men's singles as two of the top 56 eligible players in the ATP World Rankings as of 6 June 2016.

Having been directly entered to the singles, Čilić also opted to play with his partner Marin Draganja in the men's doubles. Following the withdrawal of several players, Ana Konjuh (world no. 76) received an entry on 15 July 2016.

Water polo

Summary

Men's tournament

Croatia men's water polo team qualified for the Olympics, after reaching the final in the men's tournament at the 2015 FINA World Championships in Kazan, Russia.

Team roster

Group play

Quarterfinal

Semifinal

Gold medal match

Weightlifting

For the first time since 2004, Croatia has received an unused quota place from IWF to send a male weightlifter to the Olympics, as a response to the complete ban of the Russian weightlifting team from the Games due to "multiple positive" cases of doping.

Wrestling

Croatia has received a spare host berth freed up by Brazil as the next highest-ranked eligible nation, not yet qualified, to send a wrestler competing in the men's Greco-Roman 75 kg to the Olympics, based on the results from the World Championships.

Men's Greco-Roman

References

External links 

 

Olympics
2016
Nations at the 2016 Summer Olympics